Pierre Sylvain Régis (1632–1707) was a French Cartesian philosopher and a prominent critic of Spinoza. Known as a philosopher, he was nominated to the French Academy of Sciences in 1699.

Life
Born at La Salvetat de Blanquefort, near Agen, he had a classical education, and then went to Paris. He attended the lectures of Jacques Rohault, and became a follower of the philosophy of René Descartes. He then taught the principles of Cartesianism at Toulouse (1665), Aigues-Mortes, Montpellier (1671), and Paris (1680). The prohibition issued against the teaching of Cartesianism put an end to his lectures.

Régis was elected a member of the Academy of Sciences in 1699. He died in Paris, in 1707.

Works
His major work was his Cours entier de philosophie ou Système général selon les principles de Descartes (3 vols., Paris, 1690), where he presented in a systematic way the principles of Cartesian philosophy. Opposed to Malebranche's idealism, against which he wrote in the Journal des Savants (1693 and 1694), Régis modified the system of Descartes on various points in the direction of empiricism. He denied that the human soul has innate and eternal ideas, maintained that all our ideas are modifications of the soul united to the body and that we can know our body and extension as immediately as our soul and thought.

The Cours was criticized by Pierre Daniel Huet and the Parisian Professor Jean Duhamel. Régis then wrote Réponse au livre qui a pour titre Censura philosophiæ Cartesianæ (Paris, 1691), and Réponse aux reflexions critique de M. Duhamel sur le système cartésian de M. Régis (Paris, 1692). Among his other works were Usage de la raison et de la foi, ou l'accord de la raison et de la foi, with a Réfutation de l'opinion de Spinoza, touchant l'existence et la nature de Dieu.

References

Attribution

French philosophers
1632 births
1707 deaths
Members of the French Academy of Sciences
French male non-fiction writers